Badister neopulchellus is a species of ground beetle in the family Carabidae. It is found in North America.

References

Further reading

External links

 

Harpalinae
Articles created by Qbugbot
Beetles described in 1954
Beetles of North America